The public water transport with waterbuses (colloquially named vaporetto (sing.) or vaporașe ("little ships")) is the newest public transport subsystem in Timișoara, being delivered by the local public transportation authority (Societatea de Transport Public Timișoara) and it stretches on almost 7 km of the Bega Canal. The inaugural route took place in the morning of October 4, 2018.

Line V1 
There is only one waterbus route (line V1), having nine stops along the Bega Canal, from the Modoș Bridge (downstream) to the Mihai Viteazul Bridge (upstream). The stations are equipped with a covered waiting space, with an upper waiting platform and a floating dock.

As of 2018 (autumn season), the line was served by two or three vessels. Upstream, the route takes about 64 minutes, and downstream, 50 minutes. A waterbus can take on board up to as much as 50 passengers, and the crew is composed of at least 2 sailors.

Schedule 
The hydrobuses navigate as a public transport means from Mondays through Fridays, and in weekends they navigate for leisure, with embarkment and debarkation at the Catedrala Mitropolitană stop.

In 2018, the waterbuses navigated until December 8, after that being brought to a depot until the end of the winter.

The stations 
The stations are covered, having four benches, an upper waiting platform which is connected to the floating dock by a metallic gangway. Each of the stations has also a cabin which can be used for various purposes.

Each station has also a bicycle rack of the local public transport authority.

See more 
 Timișoara
 Public Transport in Timișoara
 Waterbus

Notes 

Public transport in Romania
Timișoara